Raúl Florcita Alarcón Rojas (born 15 October 1945), popularly known as Florcita Motuda, is a Chilean musician and politician. He served as National Deputy in the Chamber of Deputies between March 2018 and March 2022, representing district 17. He was one of the most historical members of the Humanist Party. He is well known for his flamboyant style for clothing and musical work, even when serving as Deputy.

He was part of numerous festivals, like Festival of Viña del Mar, Lollapalooza Chile and OTI Festival.

Biography 
He was born in the city of Curicó, in the Maule region, in central Chile, to José Raúl Alarcón and Elsa Eliana Rojas Aliste on the 15th of October, 1945. He lived in a small nearby town, La Huerta de Mataquito, with his two parents and his aunts. At the age of 11, his father (an ex-laborer) died, as he himself points out, affected by meningitis caused by a tooth cavity.

He has been married three times: first to the Bolivian Sandy Pérez, then to Loreto Campos, and, later on, to Sara Campos. He has two children: Francisca Olivia Florcita de la Paz, also a musician, with a degree in music and a drummer for Golem; and Lucas Merlín Alarcón Campos.

Musical career 
He came to Santiago to study at the National Conservatory of Music of the University of Chile, where he formed the band Los Stéreos and later Los Sonny's. He worked in the permanent orchestra of the Saturday television program Sábados Gigantes, conducted by Mario Kreutzberger, Don Francisco.

At the time, he contacted with the Humanist movement and actively participated in it. There he assumed the doctrine of New Humanism. He created a character to overcome his obstacles in his relationship with the opposite sex and to make room for his artistic expression: "Florcita Motuda", which, according to Alarcón, reflects his blossoming to life. He worked as a music teacher in schools in Santiago.

In the 1970s he began to participate in television programs as a leading character. In 1977 he participated in the Viña del Mar Festival with the song "Brevemente... Gente (Del Espacio...)", with which he obtained the Best Performer award. The following year he participated in the OTI Festival, held in Santiago de Chile with "Pobrecito mortal".

He would represent Chile again in the OTI competition in 1981, with the song Si hoy tenemos que cantar a tanta gente, pensémoslo, with which he obtained fifth place.

During the 90s he was considered a cult artist and a reference for the new generations of rock musicians. He participated in various workshops and music schools as a Creativity teacher.

In 1998, he participated for the third time in the OTI Festival in San José, Costa Rica, obtaining first place with the theme "Fin de siglo: Es tiempo de inflamarse, deprimirse o transformarse", being the second Chilean to win this contest, after Fernando Ubiergo in 1984.

In 2005 he also participated in the TVN program Rojo VIP, where he got third place.

Political career 
He was one of the founders of the Humanist Party. He actively participated in television programs as a representative of Humanism and of the opposition to the military dictatorship. This was reflected in his musical career, as he released a cassette titled La Fiesta del NO!!!, in reference to the "NO" option during the national plebescite of 1988.

In 1999, he actively participated in the presidential campaign of Tomás Hirsch, and in 2004 he again contributed his creativity to the municipal campaign of the Juntos Podemos pact. In 2005 he was registered as a candidate for deputy for the Humanist Party in Florida, Santiago, also within the Juntos Podemos pact.

In the 2017 parliamentary elections, he was elected deputy for the 17th district. Alarcón attended his first day as a legislator in the Chilean Congress dressed in his white cape with moons and black stars, in addition to the antennas on his head. The musician used his "gala" suit to attend the Plenary of Congress and the start of the new legislature, where his wardrobe did not go unnoticed by the cameras and television. He justified his decision by saying: "Imagine if I arrived dressed in a suit and tie, what would the headline be? I haven't even paid them and they already bought it bought it. It's a politically necessary fact; it also represents the diversity that our country has".

In January 2021, after being accused of sexual harassment, he resigned from the Humanist Party. His term ended in March 2022.

References

1945 births
Living people
Chilean humanists
Members of the Chamber of Deputies of Chile
Humanist Party (Chile) politicians
Chilean television personalities